Scythris deplanata is a moth of the family Scythrididae. It was described by Edward Meyrick in 1928. It is found in Kashmir and Kumaon.

The wingspan is 14–15 mm. The forewings are rather glossy whitish-grey, with the plical and second discal stigmata minute, faintly grey and hardly traceable. The hindwings are grey.

References

deplanata
Moths described in 1928